Empis tessellata is a species of dance fly, in the fly family Empididae. It is included in the subgenus Euempis.

Distribution
The species is distributed in most of Europe from the Mediterranean to Scandinavia, in the east to the Middle East and Central Asia to Japan.

Habitat
These dance flies can be found on various plants on moist meadows, on forest edges, on clearings and lightly wooded areas.

Description

These large dance flies have a strongly black bristled body. The long legs are varying in color, usually they are red-yellow with black thighs. The brown-tinged wings have dark brown veins and rusty-yellow costal margin. The head is small and almost spherical with black antennae, large brown eyes and a long pointed proboscis.

The thorax is gray-black in ground color and carries three black longitudinal stripes. The abdomen is elongated and arched, marbled bronze-gray. The 3rd (last) antennal segment bears a two-segmented seta. The sexes are distinguishable by the size of their eyes. In the males, they are narrowly contiguous, widely separated in the females.

Empis tessellata is the largest British Empis species, though there are other similar sized species in mainland Europe.

Biology
Adults can be seen from April to August. Apparently, only adult males are predatory on other insects, but also larvae are predatory. Adults mainly hunt Diptera or other small insects, but they also feed on the nectar of flowers. especially of umbellifers.

Before mating, the male catches prey to present as a gift to the female. Only then the mating takes place. The creamy-yellow larvae live underneath the ground and in leaf litter.

Gallery

References

Empis
Asilomorph flies of Europe
Insects described in 1794
Articles containing video clips